KKFD-FM (95.9 FM, "Classic 96") is a radio station broadcasting a classic hits music format. Licensed to Fairfield, Iowa, United States, the station is currently owned by Alpha Media, through licensee Alpha Media Licensee LLC.

References

External links

KFD-FM
Classic hits radio stations in the United States
Jefferson County, Iowa
Radio stations established in 1964
1964 establishments in Iowa
Alpha Media radio stations